Aitken  is a large lunar impact crater that lies on the far side of the Moon, named for Robert Grant Aitken, an American astronomer specializing in binary stellar systems. It is located to the southeast of the crater Heaviside, and north of the unusual formation Van de Graaff. Attached to the southwest rim is Vertregt. To the southeast is the smaller Bergstrand.

The inner wall of Aitken is terraced and varies notably in width with the narrowest portion in the southwest. The crater Aitken  Z lies across the inner north wall. Just to the north of the rim is the small crater Aitken which is surrounded by an ejecta blanket of lighter-albedo material. The interior floor has been resurfaced in the past by a darker lava flow, especially in the southern half.  There are also several small crater impacts on the eastern floor, an arcing central ridge line just to the east of the midpoint, and a line of smaller ridges in the western half.

This crater lies along the northern rim of the immense South Pole-Aitken Basin, which was named after this crater, and the southern lunar pole, two extreme points of the Basin.

Aitken was a target of observation on Apollo 17 due to the command module's orbit passing directly over it.

Satellite craters 

By convention, these features are identified on Lunar maps by placing the letter on the side of the crater midpoint that is closest to Aitken.

See also 
 3070 Aitken, minor planet
 South Pole-Aitken Basin

References

External links 

 Digital Lunar Orbiter Photo Number II-033-H3
 Figure 178 in Chapter 5 of APOLLO OVER THE MOON: A View From Orbit (NASA SP-362, 1978) describes unusual features in Aitken, and Figure 84 in Chapter 4 describes a mare ridge in the crater

L&PI topographic maps of Aitken:
 LTO-86D4 Aitken Borealis
 LTO-104A1 Aitken Australis

Impact craters on the Moon